Puru Chibber is an Indian television actor best known for playing the role of Hameer Rizvi in Yash Raj Films' crime drama Khotey Sikkey on Sony TV and Sachin  Deshmukh in television show Pavitra Rishta. He also starred in the movies Band Baaja Baaraat and Bhoomi.

He was also seen portraying the roles of Rocky Singh in Beintehaa, Karan in Do Dil Bandhe Ek Dori Se, and Ketan Mehta in Naamkarann.

Personal life

Chibber was born on 22 August 1990 in New Delhi, and is son of actress Vibha Chibber, who was seen in the serial Bidaai and Mrs. Kaushik Ki Paanch Bahuein.

Career

Chibber played the role of Hameer Rizvi, the son of an owner of a pharmaceutical company and expert in gambling, in Khotey Sikkey which is about five rich youngsters and one stubborn cop who manages to solve various crimes in an unorthodox manner but emerges victorious.

He was also seen in the 2010 movie Band Baaja Baraat, in which he played the role of Bittoo's(Ranveer Singh) best friend. He has also worked in the movies Choo Lenge Akash and The Warrior. He was also seen in Ekta Kapoor's show Pavitra Rishta on Zee TV, as Sachin Deshmukh. He was also seen in the show Beintehaa as Rocky Singh and Do Dil Bandhe Ek Dori Se as Karan.He plays the role of Ketan Mehta in the Star Plus show Naamkaran.Currently[2021],he plays the role of SP Abhay Anand in the OTT (Sonyliv) platform Web Series Love J Action.

Filmography

Shows 
 2022 : Sab Satrangi as Deepu Maurya
 2016–2017 : Naamkarann as Ketan Mehta
 2015 : Reporters (Indian TV series) as Rony
 2015 : Adaalat as Tara Singh
 2014 : Do Dil Bandhe Ek Dori Se as Karan
 2014 : Beintehaa as Rocky Singh
 2014 : Yeh Hai Aashiqui as Raghav in episode 28
 2012 : Gumrah – End Of Innocence
 2011-2012 : Pavitra Rishta as Sachin Deshmukh (Sachu)
 2011 : Khotey Sikkey as Hameer Rizvi
 2011 : Rishta.com as Mihir in Episode 19
 2014–2015: Box Cricket League 1 as Contestant
 2016: Box Cricket League 2 as Contestant

Movies 
 2001 : Choo Lenge Akash
 2001 : The Warrior
 2010 : Band Baaja Baraat as Bittoo's best friend
 2015 : Meinu Ek Ladki Chaahiye
 2016 : A Scandall
 2017 : Bhoomi

Web series 
 2021 :  Love J Action as SP Abhay Anand

References

External links

 

Indian male television actors
Living people
1990 births